The 1942 Delaware State Hornets football team represented the State College for Colored Students—now known as Delaware State University—in the 1942 college football season as an independent. Led by first-year head coach Dyke Smith, the Hornets compiled a 3–1–1 record.

Schedule

References

Delaware State
Delaware State Hornets football seasons
Delaware State Hornets football